The 2018 Erste Bank Open 500 was a men's tennis tournament played on indoor hard courts. It was the 44th edition of the event, and part of the ATP World Tour 500 Series of the 2018 ATP World Tour. It was held at the Wiener Stadthalle in Vienna, Austria, from 22 October until 28 October 2018. Second-seeded Kevin Anderson won the singles title.

Points and prize money

Point distribution

Singles main-draw entrants

Seeds

 Rankings are as of October 15, 2018

Other entrants
The following players received wildcards into the singles main draw: 
  Félix Auger-Aliassime
  Jürgen Melzer
  Dennis Novak

The following player received entry as a special exempt:
  Gaël Monfils

The following players received entry from the qualifying draw:
  Ruben Bemelmans
  Pierre-Hugues Herbert
  Denis Kudla
  Mikhail Kukushkin

The following players received entry as lucky losers:
  Cameron Norrie
  Andrey Rublev

Withdrawals
Before the tournament
  Pablo Carreño Busta → replaced by  Frances Tiafoe
  Chung Hyeon → replaced by  Andrey Rublev
  Richard Gasquet → replaced by  Cameron Norrie
  Nick Kyrgios → replaced by  Nikoloz Basilashvili

During the tournament
  Jürgen Melzer

Retirements
  Borna Ćorić
  Gaël Monfils

Doubles main-draw entrants

Seeds

1 Rankings are as of October 15, 2018

Other entrants
The following pairs received wildcards into the doubles main draw:
  Jürgen Melzer /  Philipp Oswald
  Lucas Miedler /  Dennis Novak

The following pair received entry from the qualifying draw:
  Denys Molchanov /  Igor Zelenay

The following pairs received entry as lucky losers:
  James Cerretani /  Denis Kudla
  Andreas Mies /  Hans Podlipnik Castillo

Withdrawals
Before the tournament
  John Isner
  Jürgen Melzer

Finals

Singles

  Kevin Anderson defeated  Kei Nishikori, 6–3, 7–6(7–3)

Doubles

  Joe Salisbury /  Neal Skupski defeated  Mike Bryan /  Édouard Roger-Vasselin, 7–6(7–5), 6–3

References

External links
 
 ATP tournament profile

Erste Bank Open
Vienna Open
Erste Bank Open
Erste Bank Open